Sauvagella madagascariensis is a small species of fish in the family Clupeidae. It is endemic to fresh and brackish water in rivers of eastern Madagascar, ranging from the Mananjary to the Mananara.

References

Sauvagella
Freshwater fish of Madagascar
Taxonomy articles created by Polbot
Fish described in 1883